Al-Fayhaa Stadium (Arabic: ملعب الفيحاء), also known as Mohamed Musbah Al‑Waeli Stadium is a multi-purpose stadium in Basra, Southern Iraq. The stadium is part of the much larger Basra Sports City complex, and is surrounded by many football training pitches, four Five Star hotels and other sports-related facilities.  It is currently used mostly for football matches and also has facilities for athletics. The stadium has an official capacity of 10,000 spectators. It is owned by the Government of Iraq.

It hosts Naft Al-Basra SC and Al-Minaa SC football matches in the Iraqi League when attendance is low. For crucial confrontations, it is the main stadium of Basra (65,000) that welcomes the games.

Certificate
The stadium obtained the IAAF Class 1 Certificate, which signifies that the stadium satisfies the highest norms and qualities in its field.

Name
Initially, the stadium had no specific name other than Basra Sports City Secondary Stadium. Later, it was agreed to rename it Al-Fayhaa Stadium in reference to the nickname of the city Al Basra. This name is still used officially and is the most common one.

In 2019, the Ministry of Youth and Sports introduced a new appellation Mohamed Musbah Al-Waeli Stadium   as a tribute to the ex-mayor of Al Basra who was a main figure in the elaboration of the Basra Sports City complex. However, this designation is still not very popular and not much used in sports circles.

See also 
List of football stadiums in Iraq
Basra Sports City

References

Football venues in Iraq
Basra
Athletics (track and field) venues in Iraq
Multi-purpose stadiums in Iraq
Al-Mina'a SC
Sports venues completed in 2013
2013 establishments in Iraq
Buildings and structures in Basra